David Geyer (6 November 1855 – 6 November 1932) was a German zoologist, malacologist and paleontologist.

Bibliography 
Works by David Geyer were published in German language:

 (1896). Unsere Land- und Süsswasser-Mollusken. Einführung in die Molluskenfauna Deutschlands. Nebst einem Anhang über das Sammeln der Mollusken: i-vi, 1-85, i-xii. Stuttgart.
 (1908). "Beiträge zur Molluskenfauna Schwabens II. Vallonien". Jahreshefte des Vereins fuer vaterländische Naturkunde in Württemberg 64: 305-330, Taf. 3-4. Stuttgart.
 (1909). Unsere Land- und Süsswasser-Mollusken. Einführung in die Molluskenfauna Deutschlands. Nebst einem Anhang über das Sammeln der Mollusken (2nd ed.): i-viii, 1-155. Stuttgart.
 (1909). Die Weichtiere Deutschlands: eine biologische Darstellung der einheimischen Schnecken und Muscheln.
 (1917). "Die Mollusken des schwäbischen Lösses in Vergangenheit und Gegenwart". Jahresber. Ver. vaterl. Naturk. Württemberg 73: 23-92, pi. 2.
 (1925). "David Geyer geboren am 6. November 1855 zu Köngen am Neckar". Archiv für Molluskenkunde, 57: 162-170. (autobiography)
 (1927). Unsere Land- und Süsswasser-Mollusken. Einführung in die Molluskenfauna Deutschlands (3rd ed.): i-xi, 1-224. Stuttgart.

Species described by David Geyer include:
 Vallonia suevica Geyer, 1908

Species and subspecies named in honor of David Geyer include:
 Vertigo geyeri Lindholm, 1925
 Bythiospeum geyeri (Fuchs, 1925)
 Valvata piscinalis geyeri (Menzel, 1904)
 Xerocrassa geyeri (Soós, 1926)

 References 

 Further reading 
 Anon. 1925 "David Geyer zum 70. Geburtstage!" Archiv für Molluskenkunde, 57: 161.
 Wägele H. 1933. "David Geyer Geb. 6. Nov. 1855, gest. 6. Nov. 1932". Archiv für Molluskenkunde'', 65: 70–84.

External links 
 

1855 births
1932 deaths
19th-century German zoologists
German malacologists
20th-century German zoologists